JuK is a free software audio player by KDE, the default player since K Desktop Environment 3.2. JuK supports collections of MP3, Ogg Vorbis, and FLAC audio files.

JuK was started by Scott Wheeler in 2000, and was originally called QTagger; however, it was not until 2002 that the application was moved into KDE CVS, where it has grown into a mature audio application. It was first officially part of KDE in KDE 3.2.

Features 
Though an able music player, JuK is primarily an audio jukebox application, with a strong focus on management of music, as shown by features such as:

 Collection list and multiple user defined playlists.
 Ability to scan directories to automatically import playlists (.m3u files) and music files on start up.
 Dynamic Search Playlists that are automatically updated as fields in the collection change.
 A Tree View mode where playlists are automatically generated for sets of albums, artists and genres.
 Playlist history to indicate which files have been played and when.
 Inline search for filtering the list of visible items.
 The ability to guess tag information from the file name or using MusicBrainz online lookup.
 File renamer that can rename files based on the tag content.
 ID3v1, ID3v2 and Ogg Vorbis tag reading and editing support (via TagLib).

See also

References 

Audio player software that uses Qt
Free media players
KDE Applications
Linux media players
Online music database clients